Cornigliano, also called Cornigliano Ligure (to distinguish it from similar namesake Corigliano) is a western quarter of the Italian city of Genoa.

Geography 
Cornigliano lies on the coast about 7 kilometres west of the center of Genoa, between the quarters of Sampierdarena and Sestri Ponente. Cornigliano includes in its territory also the hamlets of Campi, Coronata and Erzelli. Along with Sestri Ponente is part of Medio Ponente sixth 'municipio' (administrative subdivision of Genoa).

Along the eastern boundary of the quarter one of the two main torrents flowing through Genoa, river Polcevera, flows and has its mouth into the Ligurian Sea.

Quartieri of Genoa
Former municipalities of the Province of Genoa